Mathias Fredriksson (born 11 February 1973 in Uddevalla, Västra Götaland County) is a Swedish former cross-country skier who has competed since 1993. He earned a bronze medal in the 4 × 10 km relay at the 2006 Winter Olympics in Turin. Fredriksson's best Olympic finish was at these same Olympics with a tenth in the 50 km event.

Fredriksson has won four medals at the FIS Nordic World Ski Championships; two silvers (15 km and 4 × 10 km: both 2001) and two bronzes (4 × 10 km relay: 2003, 2007). He has 34 victories on the national, FIS, and World Cup levels at various distances since 1993. He won the World Cup in the 2002–03 season.

Fredriksson has a brother, Thobias Fredriksson, at the same professional level. He is married to Emma Helena Nilsson.

In October 2008 he was sentenced to sixteen days in prison for breaking the speed limit at Dovrefjell in June the same year. Fredriksson retired at the end of the 2012 season. His last competition was the Åre Cross Country Open on 14 April 2012.

In November 2013 he joined Sveriges Television as an expert commentator and studio analyst, covering the FIS Cross-Country World Cup and World Championships.

Cross-country skiing results
All results are sourced from the International Ski Federation (FIS).

Olympic Games
 1 medal – (1 bronze)

World Championships
 4 medals – (2 silver, 2 bronze)

World Cup

Season titles
 1 title – (1 overall)

Season standings

Individual podiums
 9 victories – (9 ) 
 15 podiums – (15 )

Team podiums
 5 victories – (4 , 1 )
 19 podiums – (18 , 1 )

See also
List of Olympic medalist families

References

External links
 
 
 
 Interview with Mathias Fredriksson in The Ski Journal
 
 

1973 births
Living people
People from Uddevalla Municipality
Cross-country skiers from Västra Götaland County
Swedish male cross-country skiers
Cross-country skiers at the 1994 Winter Olympics
Cross-country skiers at the 1998 Winter Olympics
Cross-country skiers at the 2002 Winter Olympics
Cross-country skiers at the 2006 Winter Olympics
Swedish prisoners and detainees
Olympic cross-country skiers of Sweden
Olympic bronze medalists for Sweden
Olympic medalists in cross-country skiing
FIS Nordic World Ski Championships medalists in cross-country skiing
FIS Cross-Country World Cup champions
Medalists at the 2006 Winter Olympics
Häggenås SK skiers
Östersunds SK skiers
Axa SC skiers